Jamie Louise "Ja'mie" King is a fictional character portrayed by actor Chris Lilley in the Australian comedy series We Can Be Heroes: Finding The Australian of the Year (2005), Summer Heights High (2007), Ja'mie: Private School Girl (2013), and the podcast series Ja'miezing (2021). Ja'mie was born in South Africa but lives in Kirribilli in the upper class North Shore region of Sydney, New South Wales.

Ja'mie is a student in Year 11 at Hillford Girls' Grammar School—a fictional private school on Sydney's affluent North Shore—who is highly driven, charismatic, and accomplished but also narcissistic, neurotic, manipulative, and callous.  The character was developed by Lilley with the assistance of comedian Ryan Shelton. Lilley developed the character's mannerisms by using recorded interviews with private schoolgirls and also eavesdropping. Lilley states that he didn't want teenage girls to watch it and think "that's such an older guy's view of teenagers".

Appearances

We Can Be Heroes
Lilley introduces the character as a 16-year-old student in Sydney who attends Hillford Girls' Grammar and is one of several nominees for the Australian of the Year Award.

Summer Heights High
Lilley reprises his role of Ja'mie King, a private school exchange student, in the show Summer Heights High broadcast first on 5 September 2007.

Ja'mie: Private School Girl
Lilley once again reprises his role of Ja'mie in the show Ja'mie: Private School Girl, first broadcast on 23 October 2013. The series is Lilley's first to be dedicated entirely to Ja'mie and depicts Ja'mie's final year of high school as she competes for the Hillford Medal.

Podcast 
In 2021, Ja'mie released a podcast on various platforms, including YouTube, titled Ja’miezing.

Filming locations
Episode 2 shows the inside of a hall which was filmed in Keysborough, Victoria at Haileybury College. The framed portrait photos on the wall show the past Haileybury principals however for purposes of the show, new portraits were created and put in the frames. Haileybury's logo was also modified for the show, replacing the castle with a flower as well as some other changes.

Awards and nominations

ARIA Music Awards
The ARIA Music Awards are a set of annual ceremonies presented by Australian Recording Industry Association (ARIA), which recognise excellence, innovation, and achievement across all genres of the music of Australia. They commenced in 1987.

! 
|-
| 2014 || "Learning to Be Me" || ARIA Award for Best Comedy Release ||  || 
|-

References

Comedy television characters
Cross-dressing in television
Female characters in television
Fictional bisexual females
Fictional bullies
Television characters introduced in 2005
Fictional people from New South Wales
Teenage characters in television